Zentropa, or Zentropa Entertainments, is a Danish film company started in 1992 by director Lars von Trier and producer Peter Aalbæk Jensen. Zentropa is named after the train company Zentropa in the film Europa (1991), which started the collaboration between von Trier and Jensen.

History 
It has produced over 70 feature films and has become the largest film production company in Scandinavia. It owns a number of subsidiary companies in Europe. Zentropa is also responsible for creating a large studio complex called Filmbyen (Film City), where both Zentropa and many other film-related companies are located.

Zentropa may be best known for creating the Dogme 95 movement, leading to such acclaimed films as Idioterne (1998), Festen (1998) and Mifunes sidste sang (1999).

In 1998, von Trier made history by having his company Zentropa to be the world's first mainstream film company to produce hardcore pornographic films, under the division Puzzy Power. Three of these films, Constance (1998), Pink Prison (1999), and the adult/mainstream crossover-feature All About Anna (2005), were made primarily for a female audience and were extremely successful in Europe, with the first two being directly responsible for the legalising of pornography in Norway in March 2006.Zentropa's initiative spearheaded a European wave of female-friendly porn films from directors such as Anna Span, Erika Lust  and Petra Joy, while von Trier's company Zentropa was forced to abandon the experiment  due to pressure from its English business partners. In July 2009, women's magazine Cosmopolitan ranked Pink Prison as No. 1 in its Top Five of the best women's porn, calling it the "role model for the new porn-generation".

Sexual harassment allegations 
In November 2017, in the wake of the Me Too movement, nine women – all former employees at Zentropa – spoke of an "ingrained" culture of abuse at the studio. Several of the those interviewed said that their treatment had prompted them to stop working in the film industry altogether. Jensen, the company's co-founder, was specifically accused of sexual misconduct and sidelined from operations. An internal memo stated that he would no longer exercise "influence on the daily leadership of the company [and] will not partake in any management meetings." According to von Trier, Jensen stepped down and passed to Anders Kjaerhauge as CEO of Zentropa when the former's further allegations of harassment came to light.

Selected productions

Subsidiaries 
 EF Rental
 Electric Parc
 Puzzy Power
 Trust Film Sales
 Zentropa Real
 Zentropa Interaction
 Zentropa Rekorder
 Zentropa Klippegangen
 Zentropa International Köln GmbH
 Zentropa International Poland
 Zentropa International Sweden

Awards 
Zentropa won many awards and nominations from local ceremonies including Robert and Bodil, as well as two Academy Award for Best International Feature Film for In a Better World and Another Round, both were directed by critically acclaimed Dogme 95-competitors Susanne Bier and Thomas Vinterberg.

References

External links 
 
 
 Filmbyen official site
 Zentropa at IMDb
 Interview with Peter Aalbæk Jensen

Film production companies of Denmark
Mass media companies based in Copenhagen
Companies based in Hvidovre Municipality
Danish companies established in 1992
Danish film studios
Danish brands
Film distributors
Lars von Trier